Chance of Rain is the fourth studio album by Swiss recording artist Stefanie Heinzmann. It was released by Universal Music Domestic on 27 March 2015 in German-speaking Europe.

Track listing

Charts

Weekly charts

Year-end charts

References

External links 
 

2015 albums
Stefanie Heinzmann albums